Coleg Cambria in North East Wales is one of the UK's largest colleges, with over 7000 full-time and 20,000 part-time students, and has international links covering four continents. Coleg Cambria was created following the merger of Deeside College and Yale College, Wrexham. Coleg Cambria began operating on 1 August 2013. Coleg Cambria is a young adult community for people aged 16 years and older.

It serves three local authority areas with a total population of almost 400,000: more than 12% of the population of Wales. The college works in partnership with over 1000 employers including Airbus, JCB, Kelloggs, Kronospan, Moneypenny, UPM Shotton Paper and Village Bakery.

Coleg Cambria won the 2015 Global Enterprise Challenge.

In November 2015, the college was inspected by Estyn and rated excellent in both current performance and prospects for improvement.

Locations 

Coleg Cambria has six campuses across North East Wales: Deeside, Yale (Grove Park and Bersham Road in Wrexham), Llysfasi and Northop.

Name 
Coleg is the Welsh word for college and Cambria is the Latin name for Wales, derived from the Welsh name Cymru.

Branding and Logo 
The 'spectrum design' was developed and chosen with support from students, staff, Governors and local businesses and is intended to signify the diversity and inclusivity of the college. The spectrum mark also forms an abstract letter C.

References

External links
 Coleg Cambria
Estyn Reports

 

Universities and colleges in Wales
Further education colleges in the Collab Group
Educational institutions established in 2013
2013 establishments in the United Kingdom